Sharon Fichman and Marie-Ève Pelletier were the defending champions, having won the event in 2012, but both players chose not to defend their title.

Lena Litvak and Carol Zhao won the tournament, defeating Julie Coin and Emily Webley-Smith in the final, 7–5, 6–4.

Seeds

Draw

References 
 Draw

Challenger Banque Nationale de Granby
Challenger de Granby